Adam Roberts may refer to:
 Adam Roberts (scholar) (born 1940), British scholar of international relations
 Adam Roberts (British writer) (born 1965), British academic, critic and novelist
 Adam Roberts (born 1979), American food writer and humorist who blogs under the pseudonym Amateur Gourmet
 Adam Roberts (footballer) (born 1991), English professional footballer
 Adam Roberts (motorcyclist) (born 1984), Canadian motorcycle racer